The West Virginia University College of Law is the professional school for the study of law at West Virginia University in Morgantown, West Virginia, United States. The law school was established in 1878 as the first professional school in the state, and remains the only law school in the state.

The law school is a member of the Association of American Law Schools and is accredited by the American Bar Association.

History 
Founded in 1878, the WVU College of Law opened to students, with classes taken in Woodburn Hall. The school would move to Colson Hall in 1923, and finally to its current location on Law School Hill in 1974. The university settled on this location following its acquisition from the Morgantown Country Club, with the building being renovated in 2012.

The first graduate, William R. Thompson, received his LLB in 1879. In 1895, the first female graduate, Agnes Westbrook Morrison, graduated from the College of Law. In 1949, Charles E. Price was the first African-American student to graduate from the College.

West Virginia Law Review 
Founded in 1894, the West Virginia Law Review is the fourth oldest law review in the United States and publishes three issues each year. The West Virginia Law Review is a professional, student-governed legal journal that publishes articles of interest to legal scholars, students, legislators, and members of the practicing bar. The publication, which includes notes, comments, and articles of scholarly and practical value to the legal community, is published by a student editorial board.

Clinics 
General Practice Law Clinic
Child & Family Law Clinic with Medical-Legal Partnership
Immigration Law Clinic
West Virginia Innocence Project Law Clinic
Taxpayer Advocacy Law Clinic
Veterans Assistance Project Law Clinic
Entrepreneurship & Innovation Law Clinic
Land Use & Sustainable Development Law Clinic
U.S. Supreme Court Law Clinic

List of Deans 

Clyde L. Colson

12th. E. Gordon Gee (1979-1981)

14th. Teree E. Foster (1993-1997)

15th. John W. Fisher, II (1998-2007)

16th. Joyce E. McConnell (2008-2014)

17th. Gregory W. Bowman (2015-2020)

18th. Amelia Smith Rinehart (2021–Present)

Academics

Admissions 
For the Class of 2022, the College of Law enrolled 115 students with an average LSAT of 154 and an average GPA of 3.46/4.00. The average age is 25, with a range of 21 to 44; 53% are female; 8% self-identify as minority. 
Out-of-state residents comprise 43% of the Class of 2022.

Rankings 
 U.S. News & World Report listed WVU's full-time Juris Doctor program as 118th in the nation in 2023.
 #74 Best Law School for Environmental Law, # 76 in Health Care Law, #96 in Tax Law
Top 25 Law School for Corporate Leadership – independent research by Professor Robert Anderson, Pepperdine University
 #31 Law School for Federal Clerkships — independent research, ABA data (2018)
 #2 Law School for Greatest Community Impact —The National Jurist (2017)
 Top Law School for Public Interest Law (A) and Environment Law (A) — preLaw Magazine (2019)
 Best Value Law School — preLaw Magazine/The National Jurist (2018, 2017, 2016, 2015)

Bar-passage rates 
Until 1989 graduates of the Law School were granted "Diploma Privileges" in West Virginia. This meant that graduates of WVU Law were not required to take the West Virginia Bar Exam. They were automatically licensed to practice law upon graduation. The most common bar exam for a graduate of the West Virginia University College of Law is the Uniform Bar Exam. The passing UBE score in West Virginia is 270.

ABA Ultimate Bar Passage Rate - 2019: 85.57%
ABA Ultimate Bar Passage Rate - 2018: 88%
First-time Bar Passage Rate - 2017: 79.81%

Employment 
For the Class of 2018, the employment rate for full-time/long-term Bar Passage Required jobs was 66.3%. It was 7.1% for J.D. Advantage jobs. The employment rate for private practice jobs was 54.7%; for judicial clerkships, 13%; and for jobs in public interest law, 11.9%.

Cost of attendance 
The total cost of attendance (indicating the cost of tuition, fees, and living expenses) at West Virginia University for the 2019-2020 academic year is $39,598 for WV residents, and $56,118 for non-residents. The Law School Transparency estimated debt-financed cost of attendance for three years is $152,702 for WV residents, and is $206,968 for non-residents.

Notable alumni
Graduates of the West Virginia University College of Law practice in 46 US states, as well as every county of West Virginia. The school has many notable alumni, which include former governors, judges, businessmen, congressmen, and diplomats:

Tim Armstead (J.D. 1990), Justice, Supreme Court of Appeals of West Virginia
Carl George Bachmann (L 1915), U.S. Congressman from West Virginia and Minority Whip 
William W. Barron (L 1934), 27th Attorney General of West Virginia, 26th Governor of West Virginia 
Irene Berger (L 1979), Judge, United States District Court for the Southern District of West Virginia 
John T. Chambers (J.D. 1974), CEO of Cisco 
Robert Charles Chambers (L 1977), Judge, United States District Court for the Southern District of West Virginia 
William G. Conley (L 1893), 18th Governor of West Virginia 
John Thomas Copenhaver Jr. (L 1950), Judge, United States District Court for the Southern District of West Virginia
Robin Davis (J.D. 1982), Former Justice, Supreme Court of Appeals of West Virginia
Joseph S. Farland (L 1938), career diplomat, U.S. Ambassador to Iran, Pakistan, Panama, Dominican Republic 
Mike Florio (J.D. 1991), founder of ProFootballTalk.com
Gina Marie Groh (J.D.), Judge, United States District Court for the Northern District of West Virginia 
Charles Harold Haden II (L 1961), Judge, United States District Court for the Northern District of West Virginia and United States District Court for the Southern District of West Virginia (1975-2004)
Kenneth Keller Hall (J.D. 1948), Judge, United States District Court for the Southern District of West Virginia (1971-1976), United States Court of Appeals for the Fourth Circuit (1976-1999)
John A. Hutchison (J.D. 1980), Justice, Supreme Court of Appeals of West Virginia
 William J. Ihlenfeld II (J.D. 1997), U.S. Attorney, United States District Court for the Northern District of West Virginia (2010-2016)
H. Marshall Jarrett (J.D.), Director for the Executive Office for United States Attorneys, U.S. Department of Justice
Irene Patricia Murphy Keeley (J.D. 1980), Judge, United States District Court for the Northern District of West Virginia 
Jeffrey V. Kessler (J.D.), President, West Virginia State Senate 
Menis E. Ketchum (J.D. 1967), Former Justice, Supreme Court of Appeals of West Virginia 
Harley M. Kilgore (L 1914), United States Senator 
Robert Bruce King (L 1968), Judge, United States Court of Appeals for the Fourth Circuit
Jon D. Levy (J.D. 1979), Chief Judge, United States District Court for the District of Maine and Former Justice, Maine Supreme Judicial Court
William C. Marland (L 1947), 24th Attorney General of West Virginia, 24th Governor of West Virginia
Spike Maynard (J.D. 1974), Former Justice, Supreme Court of Appeals of West Virginia
Darrell McGraw (J.D.), 33rd Attorney General of West Virginia and Former Justice, Supreme Court of Appeals of West Virginia
Thomas McHugh (J.D. 1964), Former Justice, Supreme Court of Appeals of West Virginia
Alan Mollohan (L 1951), U.S. Congressman from West Virginia 
Arch A. Moore, Jr. (L 1951), 28th and 30th Governor of West Virginia 
Ephraim F. Morgan (L. 1897), 16th Governor of West Virginia
Matthew M. Neely (L 1902), U.S. Congressman, 21st Governor of West Virginia, U.S. Senator from West Virginia
Mario Palumbo (L 1957), 32nd Attorney General of West Virginia 
William J. Powell (J.D. 1985), U.S. Attorney, United States District Court for the Northern District of West Virginia (2017-2021) 
Robert L. Ramsay (L 1901), U.S. Congressman from West Virginia
Richard A. Robinson (J.D. 1984), Chief Justice of Connecticut Supreme Court
George M. Scott (J.D.), Former Justice, Supreme Court of Appeals of West Virginia
Harley O. Staggers, Jr. (L 1977), U.S. Congressman from West Virginia
Larry Starcher (J.D. 1967), Former Justice, Supreme Court of Appeals of West Virginia
Stephanie Thacker (J.D. 1990), Judge, United States Court of Appeals for the Fourth Circuit
Kasey Warner (J.D. 1980), United States Attorney for the Southern District of West Virginia
William Wooton (J.D. 1971), Justice, Supreme Court of Appeals of West Virginia
Margaret Workman (J.D. 1974), Former Justice, Supreme Court of Appeals of West Virginia

References

External links
 

West Virginia University
Educational institutions established in 1878
West Virginia law
Education in Monongalia County, West Virginia
1878 establishments in West Virginia
Law schools in the United States